Conor Ferguson (born 11 October 1999) is an Irish swimmer. He competed in the men's 200 metre backstroke event at the 2017 World Aquatics Championships.

References

1999 births
Living people
British male backstroke swimmers
Place of birth missing (living people)
Irish male backstroke swimmers
Commonwealth Games competitors for Northern Ireland
Swimmers at the 2018 Commonwealth Games
Sportspeople from Belfast
Male swimmers from Northern Ireland